Daniel Rowlinson Ratcliff (2 October 1837 – 1923) was an English lock and safe manufacturer and a Liberal politician who sat in the House of Commons in 1880.

Ratcliff was born in Birmingham, the son of Joseph Ratcliff of Edgbaston, to a family of machinists and founders. He was a partner in the safe-making firm of Thomas Milner and Son. He was a J.P. for Worcestershire and Warwickshire.

At the 1880 general election Ratcliff was elected Member of Parliament for Evesham. His election was declared void in June 1880.

Ratcliff was living at Mansion House, Great Alne, Warwickshire with his wife Jane and several children in 1881. In 1889 he established the company of Ratner Safe with his son William Milner Ratcliff and John Horner.

He died at the age of 85.

Ratcliff married Jane Milner only daughter of Thomas Milner in 1862.

References

External links

1837 births
1923 deaths
Liberal Party (UK) MPs for English constituencies
UK MPs 1880–1885